Hitchins is an unincorporated community in Carter County, Kentucky, United States. Hitchins has a post office with ZIP code 41146.

References

Unincorporated communities in Carter County, Kentucky
Unincorporated communities in Kentucky